Phosphate soda is a type of beverage that has a tangy or sour taste.  These beverages became popular among children in the 1870s in the United States. Phosphate beverages were made with fruit flavorings, egg, malt, or wine.  In the 1900s, the beverages became popular, and fruit-flavoured phosphate sodas were served at soda fountains, before losing popularity to ice cream based treats in the 1930s. 

Phosphoric acid is used in many bottled soft drinks, including Coca-Cola. The original acid phosphate, made by the Horsford Chemical Company, was a mixture of calcium, magnesium and potassium phosphate salts with a small amount of phosphoric acid producing a liquid mixture with a pH of around 2 to 3, the same as freshly squeezed lime juice.

Horsford used bone ash, which is mostly calcium phosphate.  In the 21st Century, bone ash is used primarily in the ceramics industry, and is rarely available as food grade stock.  The ingredients can, however, be synthesized from modern food-grade chemicals.

References

Further reading

Phosphates
Soft drinks